"Sad Machine" is a song recorded by American electronic music producer Porter Robinson. It was released on May 13, 2014 as the second single from his debut studio album Worlds (2014). Robinson wrote, produced, and performed the track. The song contains elements of late-1990s era video game music and the Vocaloid Singing Synthesis software. It has been described by Robinson as a "duet between a human and a robot".

An official lyric video for the single premiered on May 21, 2014, and features a computer-generated hand traveling through a valley of glitchy, colorful imagery. The song was well-received from critics, and was a hit on the American Dance/Electronic Songs chart.

Composition
Sad Machine was the last song Robinson wrote for his debut studio album, Worlds. Robinson described the tone of the song to be "Fragile and vulnerable ... but wistful and nostalgic." He has also stated that the song is one of his favorites on the album. The track is 88.5 beats per minute, half of 177, the latter of which Robinson wished to imply with the lead synth in the beginning of the song. He stated that he wished for the listener to anticipate a drum and bass beat and become caught off guard when the song revealed its actual tempo.

The track uses the Vocaloid software voice, Avanna, to provide the lead vocals for the song. The male vocals on the track are provided by Robinson himself. This track also marks the first of Robinson's own tracks that he uses his own vocals on. In the past, he had provided backing vocals for Zedd's single "Clarity". When asked about singing the song during his new live performance during his Worlds Tour, Robinson stated, "I'm only going to be alive so long, and I have a song where I'm singing, and I'm going to go perform that song live and why the hell should I not sing it? I'm going to do it. I want to sing. It just felt like the right call for the song, and hopefully the right call for the show, too."

Robinson stated that he used soundfonts, which are low-quality emulations of real-life instruments. In Sad Machine, he used these soundfonts to emulate the music from the 1998 video game The Legend of Zelda: Ocarina of Time.

Charts

Certifications

Release history

References

External links
 

2014 singles
2014 songs
Porter Robinson songs
Song recordings produced by Porter Robinson
Songs written by Porter Robinson
Vocaloid songs